The 2001 NatWest Series was a One Day International cricket tri-series sponsored by the National Westminster Bank that took place in England between 7 and 23 June 2001. The series involved the national teams of England, Australia and Pakistan. Ten matches were played in total, with each team playing one another thrice during the group stage. The teams which finished in the top two positions following the group stages qualified for the final, which Australia won by defeating Pakistan at Lord's on 23 June by 9 wickets. Preceding the series, England played Pakistan in a two Test series, while following the series, 61st The Ashes series.

Venues

Squads 

Matthew Hoggard called up to the England Squad to cover for injured Andy Caddick.

Fixtures

Pool matches

1st ODI

2nd ODI

3rd ODI

4th ODI

5th ODI

6th ODI

7th ODI

8th ODI

9th ODI

Final

10th ODI

Statistics

References

External links 
 2001 NatWest Series at ESPNcricinfo

2001 in English cricket
International cricket competitions in 2001
NatWest Group